Bauria Golam Khalek (G.K) Academy is a secondary school in Sandwip Upazila, Chittagong District, Bangladesh. The school is one of the oldest and biggest (in terms of the number of students) schools in Sandwip.

Notable teachers and alumni 
 Master Shahjahan, B.A. served the school as a teacher and played a very significant role in the early stage of the school. He was the president of the managing committee of the school for long time and contributed to the development and revival of the school from its miserable condition.

References

Schools in Chittagong District